Barnard River, a perennial river of the Manning River catchment, is located in the Northern Tablelands and Mid North Coast districts of New South Wales, Australia.

Course and features
Barnard River rises on the eastern slopes of the Great Dividing Range, near Hanging Rock, east of Nundle, and flows generally east southeast, joined by seven tributaries including the Bank and Curricabark rivers, before reaching its confluence with the Manning River, near Bretti. The river descends  over its  course.

The river was first explored in 1825 by European explorer Henry Dangar, and named by Thomas Mitchell in honour of Lt. Col. Andrew Barnard.

River diversion
The diversion involves the transfer of water from Orham Dam, impounded at Barnard Weir, and pumped over the Mount Royal Range and gravity fed into the Glenbawn Dam. The diverted water then feeds into the Hunter River above its confluence with the Goulburn River. Water is accessed from the Barnard River to meet any shortfall from the Hunter River system in order to feed Plashett Dam and Lake Liddell, that are needed for the cooling of the Bayswater and Liddell electric power stations. The scheme operates under a water licence issued by the NSW Government to Macquarie Generation.

See also 

 Rivers of New South Wales
 List of rivers of New South Wales (A–K)
 List of rivers of Australia

References

External links
 

 

Rivers of New South Wales
Northern Tablelands
Mid North Coast
Rivers of the Hunter Region